Ilovlinsky District is an administrative district (raion), one of the thirty-three in Volgograd Oblast, Russia. As a municipal division, it is incorporated as Ilovlinsky Municipal District. It is located in the center of the oblast. Its administrative center is the urban locality (a work settlement) of Ilovlya. Population:  34,358 (2002 Census);  The population of Ilovlya accounts for 33.9% of the district's total population.

References

Notes

Sources

Districts of Volgograd Oblast